Puddefoot is a surname. Notable people with the surname include:

Len Puddefoot (1898–1996), English footballer and manager
Susanne Puddefoot (1934–2010), English journalist and editor
Syd Puddefoot (1894–1972), English footballer and cricketer
Walter Puddefoot, English footballer